Cagosima sanguinolenta is a species of beetle in the family Cerambycidae, and the only species in the genus Cagosima. It was described by Thomson in 1864.

References

Saperdini
Beetles described in 1864